HSwMS Sjöhästen (Shä), Sw. meaning sea horse, was the fifth and last ship of the Swedish submarine class Sjöormen, project name A11.

Development 
The planning of the class included a number of different AIP-solutions including nuclear propulsion, however the ships where finally completed with for the time extremely large batteries. The ship was a single-hulled submarine, with hull shape influenced by the American experimental submarine . The hull was covered with rubber tiles to reduce the acoustic signature (anechoic tiles), at this time a pioneer technology. The  also pioneered the use of an x-shaped (as opposed to cross-shaped) rudder as a standard (as opposed to experimental) feature.

Service in Sweden 
The submarine served in the Swedish Navy for almost 30 years and was then sold to Singapore in 1997 together with its four sister ships.

Service in Singapore 
HSwMS Sjöhästen was sold to Singapore on 28 May 1999. She was never commissioned instead used as for spare parts.

Gallery

References 

Sjöormen-class submarines
Ships built in Malmö
1968 ships
Challenger-class submarines
Republic of Singapore Navy